McConnochie is a surname. Notable people with the surname include:

John McConnochie (born 1954), New Zealand swimmer
Mardi McConnochie (born 1971), Australian writer and playwright
Rhys McConnochie (born 1936), New Zealand-Australian actor
Ruaridh McConnochie (born 1991), English rugby union player